A , also known as a brush pen, is a cartridge-based writing implement used in East Asian calligraphy; it is, in essence, an ink brush analogue to a fountain pen.

Overview
The Japanese manufacturing company Kuretake was the first to launch a brush pen in 1973, then followed by Pentel, which launched the "Pocket Brush" in 2010. The Pocket Brush used replaceable waterproof ink cartridges like fountain pens. No other brush pens were launched in the intervening 37 years.

Fudepens (designed and recommended for calligraphy) have also gained popularity among comic book artists, who choose them to ink their works instead of dip pens or traditional brushes. One of those artists using Pentel was the American comic book artist Neal Adams.

Another two Japanese brands, Sakura and Tombow, manufacture and sell brush-tip markers, named "brush pens" by themselves, although unlike Pentel or Kuretake products, Sakura's and Tombow's don't use the same type of ink and do not use refillable cartridges.

References

East Asian calligraphy
Japanese inventions
writing implements